Maxime Tarasconi (born 6 April 1990) is a French professional footballer who plays as a midfielder for Championnat National 3 side AS Gémenos.

Career
Tarasconi signed his first professional contract with Ligue 2 side FC Istres in 2011, making his league debut on 5 August that year as a substitute in the 2–1 victory against RC Lens. He went on to play 32 times over two seasons for Istres, most often as a substitute. At the end of his contract he was released. He found his next club, Louhans-Cuiseaux FC, through the coach of the unemployed Professional footballers union, although he didn't join immediately, looking at options abroad until late January 2014.

Leaving Louhans-Cuiseaux after just one season he moved from one amateur French club to another. First to US Granville in July 2014, then to SC Toulon in February 2016, US Le Pontet in August 2016 and AS Gémenos in July 2017.

References

External links

Maxime Tarasconi profile at foot-national.com

1990 births
Living people
French footballers
Association football midfielders
FC Istres players
Louhans-Cuiseaux FC players
SC Toulon players
Ligue 2 players